Quiet Moments is the ninth studio album by Lycia, released by Handmade Birds on August 20, 2013. It marks the first album of new studio material by the band since Empty Space, released ten years prior.

Track listing

Personnel
Lycia
Mike VanPortfleet – vocals, synthesizer, guitar, drum machine

Production and Additional Personnel
James Plotkin – mastering
Tara VanFlower – additional vocals (7, 11)

Release History

References

External links 
 
 Quiet Moments at Bandcamp
 Quiet Moments at iTunes

2013 albums
Lycia (band) albums